The Fortaleza San Felipe is a historic Spanish fortress located in the north of Dominican Republic in the province of Puerto Plata. It is also known as El Morro de San Felipe and was used to protect the City of Puerto Plata from pirates and corsairs. It is located on a hill at the Puntilla del Malecón, overlooking the Atlantic Ocean; its strategic location protected the entrance to the city's seaport. The construction of the fort was commissioned by King Felipe II of Spain in 1564, and it was completed in 1577 by Don Rengifo de Angulo, the fort's mayor.

Today, the Fortaleza San Felipe serves as a museum showcasing the important role it has played in the history of Puerto Plata and the Dominican Republic. The fortress houses military artifacts from the 18th and 19th centuries.

History
The fortress was the scene of one of the few land battles in the Quasi War, against the United States in May 1800. The Battle of Puerto Plata Harbor saw American forces overwhelm both the French and Spanish forces.

The Fortaleza San Felipe has been used in various occasions throughout its history as a prison; it was where Pedro Santana jailed one of the founding fathers, Juan Pablo Duarte.

The fortress was converted into a museum in 1965, underwent a major renovation in 1972 and in 1983 was officially opened to public. Today, the fortress is the only remnant of the 16th century in Puerto Plata, as everything else was destroyed in battles or fires during the War of Restoration.

See also

Virtual Tour of Fortaleza San Felipe in Puerto Plata at Virtual Tour Before You Travel

References

Museums in the Dominican Republic
San Felipe
Buildings and structures in Puerto Plata Province
Spanish colonial fortifications in the Dominican Republic
Tourist attractions in Puerto Plata Province
Puerto Plata, Dominican Republic